is the designation of a back-to-back high-voltage direct current (HVDC) facility in Japan which forms one of four frequency converter stations that link Japan's western and eastern power grids. The other three stations are at Higashi-Shimizu, Minami-Fukumitsu, and Sakuma Dam.

Converter equipment
The HVDC back-to-back facility Shin Shinano uses line-commutated thyristor converters. The station houses two converters, one of which opened in December 1977, the other in 1992.  The original 1977 converter was one of the first thyristor-based HVDC schemes to be put into operation in the world and used oil-insulated, oil-cooled outdoor thyristor valves supplied by Hitachi (60 Hz end) and Toshiba (50 Hz end). A special workshop was provided on the site, in which valve maintenance (for example replacing failed thyristors) could be carried out under clean conditions in order to avoid contamination of the oil.

The 1992 converter uses more conventional air-insulated, water-cooled thyristor valves. In 2008 the original 1977 converter was decommissioned and replaced by a third converter, similar in design to the 1992 converter but using light-triggered thyristors.

The Shin-Shinano link operates with a DC link voltage of 125 kV for each converter. The station was initially rated at 300 MW. In 1992, with the addition of the second 300 MW converter, the maximum transferable power was uprated to 600 MW.

See also
Energy in Japan
Kii Channel HVDC system
HVDC Hokkaido–Honshu

References

External links

 CIGRÉ B4 Compendium of HVDC Schemes, 2009.
 Substations of the Tokyo Electric Power Company 
 www.transmission.bpa.gov/cigresc14/Compendium/SHINSHIN.htm (archived copy)
 www.transmission.bpa.gov/cigresc14/Compendium/Shinshin%20Pictures.pdf (archived copy)

Converter stations
Electric power infrastructure in Japan
Tokyo Electric Power Company
Asahi, Nagano
Energy infrastructure completed in 1977
Energy infrastructure completed in 1992